The simple station Minuto de Dios is part of the TransMilenio mass-transit system of Bogotá, Colombia, opened in the year 2000.

Location 
The station is located in northwestern Bogotá, specifically on Avenida Calle 80, with Carrera 73 A, two blocks from Avenida Boyacá.

It serves the demand of the Palestina and Santa María del Lago neighborhoods.

History 
In 2000, phase one of the TransMilenio system was opened between Portal de la 80 and Tercer Milenio, including this station.

The station is named Minuto de Dios due to the neighborhood of the same name in which it is located. That neighborhood, in turn, is named for the Minuto de Dios foundation, which has a religious center, museum, and university in the area.

Station services

Old trunk services

Main line service

Feeder routes 
This station does not have feeder routes.

Inter-city service 
This station does not have inter-city service.

See also 
 Bogotá
 TransMilenio
 List of TransMilenio stations

External links 
 TransMilenio

TransMilenio